Lois Thompson was a college football player for the Kentucky University Pioneers, selected All-Southern in 1903. Former Yale quarterback John de Saulles credited the end Thompson as playing "a better end than any man in the South."

References

American football ends
Transylvania Pioneers football players
All-Southern college football players